Basma Abdel Aziz (Arabic: بسمة عبد العزيز, born 1976 in Cairo, Egypt) is an Egyptian writer, psychiatrist, visual artist and human rights activist, nicknamed 'the rebel'. She lives in Cairo and is a weekly columnist for Egypt's al-Shorouk newspaper. She writes in Arabic, and her novels The Queue and Here Is A Body were published in English. For her literary and nonfiction work, she was awarded the Sawiris Cultural Award and other distinctions.

Life and career
Born in Cairo, Abdel Aziz holds a B.A. in medicine and surgery, an M.S. in neuropsychiatry, and a diploma in sociology. She works for the General Secretariat of Mental Health in Egypt's Ministry of Health and the Nadeem Center for the Rehabilitation of Victims of Torture.

As a writer, Abdel Aziz gained second place for her short stories in the 2008 Sawiris Cultural Award, and a 2008 award from the General Organisation for Cultural Palaces. Her sociological examination of police violence in Egypt, Temptation of Absolute Power, won the Ahmed Bahaa-Eddin Award in 2009.

Her debut novel Al-Tabuur (The Queue) was first published by Dar al-Tanweer in 2013, and Melville House published an English translation by Elisabeth Jaquette in 2016. In 2017, this satirical novel won the English PEN Translation Award. For its dystopian representation of injustice, torture and corruption, it has been compared by the New York Times to George Orwell’s Nineteen Eighty-Four and The Trial by Franz Kafka. The novel has also been published in Turkish, Portuguese, Italian and German translations.

In 2016, she was called one of Foreign Policy 's Leading Global Thinkers. In 2018, she was named by The Gottlieb Duttweiler Institute as one of top influencers of Arabic public opinion. Her 2018 novel Here is a body, translated by Jonathan Wright, was published in English in 2011 by Hoopoe, an imprint of American University of Cairo Press.

Works

Fiction
 May God Make it Easy, 2008
 The Boy Who Disappeared, 2008
 Al-Tabuur (The Queue), 2013
 Hona Badan (Here Is A Body), 2018
The blueberry Years (Aawam Al touts), 2022

Non-fiction
 Temptation of Absolute Power, 2009
Beyond Torture, 2011
 Memory of Repression, 2014
 The Power of the Text, 2016

See also 

Contemporary Arabic literature
Egyptian literature

Further reading 
 John C. Hawley: Coping with a failed revolution: Basma Abdel Aziz, Nael Eltoukhy, Mohammed Rabie & Yasmine El Rashidi. In: Ernest N. Emenyonu (ed.): Focus on Egypt. Boydell & Brewer, Suffolk 2017, pp. 7–21. DOI: https://doi-org.uaccess.univie.ac.at/10.1017/9781787442351.003.
 Lindsey Moore: ‘What happens after saying no?’ Egyptian uprisings and afterwords in Basma Abdel Aziz's The Queue and Omar Robert Hamilton's The City Always Wins. In: CounterText 4/2. 2018, pp. 192–211.

References

External links
 Essay by Abdel Aziz on writing ‘The Queue’ at arablit.org
Excerpt from Abdel Aziz novel The Queue, translated by Elisabeth Jaquette
Excerpt from Abdel Aziz novel Here is a body, translated by Jonathan Wright
Abdel Aziz essay Reflections on the President’s Discourse 

1976 births
Living people
Egyptian psychiatrists
Egyptian novelists
Egyptian women writers